is Atsuko Maeda's second solo single. It was released in three CD+DVD "act" editions. The title track was used a theme song for the movie LOVE Masao-kun ga Iku!, which starred Shingo Katori. Following the release of this single, Maeda held her first solo live on September 15 at Nakano Sun Plaza and on September 22 at Kobe Kokusai Kaikan.

Track listings

ACT.1
CD
Kimi wa Boku da 
Migikata
Toomawari
Kimi wa Boku Da (off vocal)
Migikata (off vocal)
Toomawari (off vocal)

DVD
Kimi wa Boku Da Music Video
Kimi wa Boku Da Music Video (Drama Version)
Making the music video “Kimi wa Boku da”

ACT.2
CD
Kimi wa Boku Da
Migikata
Aishisugiru to…
Kimi wa Boku Da (off vocal)
Migikata (off vocal)
Aishisugiru to… (off vocal)

DVD
Kimi wa Boku Da Music Video
Kimi wa Boku Da Music Video (Drama Version)
Maeda Atsuko Graduation Documentary Interview

ACT.3
CD
Kimi wa Boku Da
Migikata
Sunday drive
Kimi wa Boku Da (off vocal)
Migikata (off vocal)
Sunday drive (off vocal)

DVD
Kimi wa Boku Da Music Video
Kimi wa Boku Da Music Video (Drama Version)
Bokutachi no Goshujinsama ~Aikentachi to Maeda Atsuko no Nichijou~

Charts

References 

2012 singles
Songs with lyrics by Yasushi Akimoto
2012 songs
King Records (Japan) singles